This is a listing of Oracle Corporation's corporate acquisitions, including acquisitions of both companies and individual products.

Oracle's version does not include value of the acquisition.

See also :Category:Sun Microsystems acquisitions (Sun was acquired by Oracle).

References

Further reading
 .

Oracle